The African Boxing Union (ABU;) is a not-for-profit regional sanctioning body that awards regional boxing titles in the African region. It is a boxing federation within the World Boxing Council (WBC), being affiliated with them since 1974. The president of the African Boxing Union is Houcine Houichi.

Current champions

Men's champions

See also
List of African Boxing Union champions

References

External links
 ABU official site

Organizations established in 1973
African Boxing Union
Boxing